Cárdenas is a municipality in Tabasco in south-eastern Mexico.

References

Municipalities of Tabasco